Courtney Simmons Elwood (born June 6, 1968) is an American attorney who served as the general counsel of the Central Intelligence Agency (CIA) in the Trump administration between 2017 and 2021.

Early life and education 
Elwood was born in Bethesda, Maryland. She was a member of the first graduating class of West Potomac High School in Alexandria, Virginia. She earned a Bachelor of Arts from Washington and Lee University and a Juris Doctor from Yale Law School.

Career 
Prior to assuming her post at the CIA, she was a partner with the firm Kellogg, Hansen, Todd, Figel & Frederick. She joined this firm in 1996, after clerking for Chief Justice William Rehnquist on the Supreme Court of the United States during the 1995 term and for Judge J. Michael Luttig on the United States Court of Appeals for the Fourth Circuit. 

Elwood has served as an associate counsel to the president, deputy counsel to the vice president, and deputy chief of staff and counselor to the attorney general. In March 2017, she was announced as President Donald Trump's nominee to become general counsel of the CIA. She was confirmed by the United States Senate with a vote of 67–33 on June 6, 2017.

Personal life
On November 23, 1996, she married John Elwood, also a Yale-trained lawyer, in Alexandria, Virginia.

See also 
 Trump–Ukraine scandal
 List of law clerks of the Supreme Court of the United States (Chief Justice)

References

External links
Courtney Simmons at Kellogg Hansen Law
 

1968 births
Living people
Washington and Lee University alumni
Yale Law School alumni
21st-century American lawyers
Trump administration personnel
Women government officials
Law clerks of the Supreme Court of the United States
Law clerks of J. Michael Luttig